PoliticalArena.com is the Philippines’ first socio-political networking site, developed to promote awareness and interactivity in the local political scene and its territories. It was launched in July 2009 as a common platform for all candidates to disseminate information to all voters, real time, for them to make informed decisions.

Presidential candidates of the upcoming 2010 elections can share their programs and activities, causes, views and opinions on issues and establish a relationship with supporters to further their political activities.

Registered users on the site can voice their concerns, express their views and learn more about Philippine politics through the contents posted on the site, and by interaction with candidates and with other people in the arena. The site also allows sharing of photos, videos and support to candidates through testimonials.

The Philippine Daily Inquirer called the site a "one-stop-shop website" for those aiming to run for president.

References

External links

Philippine political websites